

Albert Buck (23 January 1895 – 6 September 1942) was a German general during World War II.  He was a recipient of the Knight's Cross of the Iron Cross of Nazi Germany. 

Buck was born on 23 January 1895 in Stuttgart, Wurttemberg, in the German Empire. He served in the Reichswehr after 1913 and fought in World War I, gaining the Iron Cross (1st Class) and the Honour Cross of the World War, and during World War II he fought in the invasions of Denmark, France, and the Soviet Union. He became the Major-General in command of the German 198th Infantry Division during the war in the Soviet Union and served at Uman, Kiev, and Rostov, among other battles. He was killed at Novorossiysk on 6 September 1942 when several grenades exploded near his car.

Awards and decorations
 Iron Cross (1939) 2nd Class (17 April 1940) & 1st Class (1 August 1940)
 Knight's Cross of the Iron Cross on 17 July 1941 as Oberst and commander of Grenadier-Regiment 305
 German Cross in Gold on 13 September 1942 as Generalmajor and commander of the 198. Infanterie-Division

References

Citations

Bibliography

 
 

1895 births
1942 deaths
Military personnel from Stuttgart
Major generals of the German Army (Wehrmacht)
Recipients of the clasp to the Iron Cross, 1st class
Recipients of the Gold German Cross
Recipients of the Knight's Cross of the Iron Cross
German prisoners of war in World War I
German Army personnel killed in World War II
People from the Kingdom of Württemberg
Deaths by hand grenade
German Army personnel of World War I